Sayyid Sadr Al-Din Dashtaki or Sayyed Sanad was an  Iranian Shia philosopher  and theologian. He counts as the founder of the Shiraz school of philosophy.

Birth
Sadr Al din was born in Dashtah, a region near Shiraz. His complete name was Sayyid Muhammad b. Mansur Al Husayni Al Dashtaki. He was born in Shiraz on second of 829/19 June. He counted as the first in the Dastaki family who confessed apparently to shiism sect. According to Pourjavady, it seems that he was a Zaydi. He also challenged with Jalāl-al-Dīn Davānī on the legality of Shia.

Education
Dashtaki was educated along with his cousin and learned Arabic literature and Islamic law with him. He studied rational sciences with Qawam Al Din Al-Kurbali. Kurbali had an important role in introducing Sadr Al-Din to Philosophical discussion, as did Sayyid Muslim Farsi, who was the teacher of Sadr Al-Din in logic and philosophy. Sadr Al Din was also involved in building the houses.

Mansuriyyah Madrasah
Sadr Al-Din built a madrasah and called it Mansuriyyah, the name of his son. This Madrasah is still active in the center of Shiraz, according to Kakaei.

Works
 Jawaher namah on gemmology
 glosses on  Qutb Al Din Razi's commentary on Katibi Qazavini's Shamsiyyah
 glosses on  Qutb Al Din Razi's commentary Siraj Al Din Urmawi's Matali Al Anwar
 glosses on Qushji's commentary on Tajrīd al-iʿtiqād
 a treatise on proving the existence of God and his attributes( Risalah fi Ithbat al Wajib and Sifatihi)

Death
Sadr Al Din led a rebellion against the Ruler of Shiraz and was killed by a group of Turkmans on order of Ruler Qasem Bey. He died on 17 Ramadan 903/9 May 1498.

References

Related Readings
Bdaiwi, Ahab, "Some Remarks on the Confessional Identity of the Philosophers of Shiraz: Sadr al-Dîn Dashtakî (d. 903/1498) and his Students Mullâ Shams al-Dîn Khafrî (942/1535) and Najm al-Dîn Mahmûd Nayrîzî (948/1541),“ Ishraq 5 (2014): 61–85.

1498 deaths
People from Shiraz
Year of birth unknown
15th-century Iranian philosophers